Alice Richardson was an English pastellist active in London between 1769 and 1777.

Richardson exhibited pastels at the Society of Artists of the United Kingdom from 1769 until 1775, giving a variety of London addresses during her exhibiting career. She submitted three pastels to the Royal Academy from 4 College Street, Westminster, in 1776; this was the same address given by one "Miss Alice Roberts" in a 1777 submission to the Society of Artists. The two were one and the same, as on 28 December 1776 Richardson had married on Benjamin Roberts, a union which may have been her second marriage.

References

English women painters
18th-century English painters
18th-century English women artists
Painters from London
Year of death unknown
Pastel artists